Rui Filipe Tavares de Bastos (8 March 1968 – 28 August 1994) was a Portuguese footballer who played as a central midfielder.

Football career
Born in Vale de Cambra, Greater Metropolitan Area of Porto, Rui Filipe began his professional career with Gil Vicente F.C. in the second division, then played two seasons with S.C. Espinho, one of them in the Primeira Liga, at the age of 20. In 1990 he returned to Gil, helping the Barcelos side retain their top level status after finishing 13th.

Subsequently, Rui Filipe was bought by FC Porto, scoring four goals in 25 matches in his first year as the club won the league – during that timeframe, he first reached the Portugal national team, going on be capped six times at the highest level.

In the 1993–94 UEFA Champions League he helped his team reach the semi-finals, notably opening the scoresheet at SV Werder Bremen in a 5–0 first group stage win.

Rui Filipe continued to be an important midfield element for Porto in the following years. In the beginning of the 1994–95 campaign he scored in the league opener, and also helped them to the domestic Supercup after defeating S.L. Benfica, with the player starting in the first leg and being sent off; however, in late August, he died in a car accident at age 26.

Honours
Porto
Primeira Divisão: 1991–92, 1992–93, 1994–95
Taça de Portugal: 1993–94
Supertaça Cândido de Oliveira: 1992, 1993, 1994

References

External links

1968 births
1994 deaths
Portuguese footballers
Association football midfielders
Primeira Liga players
Liga Portugal 2 players
Gil Vicente F.C. players
S.C. Espinho players
FC Porto players
Portugal under-21 international footballers
Portugal international footballers
Road incident deaths in Portugal
Sportspeople from Aveiro District